The MLB Executive of the Year Award was established by Major League Baseball (MLB) at the conclusion of the  season. The award is given annually to one executive, including general managers, in MLB. It is voted on by all 30 MLB teams, prior to the postseason. The inaugural winner was Billy Beane of the Oakland Athletics.

Listed below in chronological order are the baseball executives chosen as recipients of the MLB Executive of the Year Award.

Award winners

See also

Baseball America Major League Executive of the Year
Sporting News Executive of the Year
List of Major League Baseball awards

References

External links
 MLB Executive of the Year at Baseball Almanac

Major League Baseball trophies and awards
Awards established in 2018